Fadd  may refer to:

Fadd, Hungary, a village in Hungary
FADD, a receptor mediating cellular apoptosis

eo:Fadd
it:Fadd
hu:Fadd
nl:Fadd
sk:Fadd